The Canadian Football League played an all-star game regularly during the 1950s and 1970s and twice in the 1980s.

1950s
The first game in 1955 actually precedes the establishment of the Canadian Football Council and the CFL, and was known as the Shrine Game, sponsored by the Shriners to raise funds for Shriners Hospitals for Children. It was held each year from 1955 to 1958 the week after the Grey Cup, as the Interprovincial Rugby Football Union All-Stars took on the Western Interprovincial Football Union.

After the 1956 contest, five players that played in the game (four from the Saskatchewan Roughriders and one from the Winnipeg Blue Bombers) were killed when Trans-Canada Air Lines Flight 810 crashed in what was then the worst air disaster in Canadian history. After poor attendances in the next two Shrine Games (the fact that they were outdoor football games played in Canada in December didn't help), the idea of an All-Star game was dropped.

1970s
The CFL All-Star Game returned in 1970, now played as a pre-season contest in late June and early July, with the league all-stars taking on the previous season's Grey Cup champion. After no game was held in 1975, the contest returned for three more years (1976–78), with East again meeting West. These games were played before the pre-season (similar to the NFL's Pro Football Hall of Fame Game), in late May and early June; again, poor attendance led to the game's cancellation.

1980s
Two more CFL All-Star Games were played, in the 1980s: a post-season contest in December 1983 (held indoors in Vancouver), pitting East and West; and a June 1988 game between the CFL All-Stars and the hometown Edmonton Eskimos. Even though the 1988 contest drew a CFL All Star-record 27,573 fans, no game has been held since then.

List of games
There have been 14 CFL All-Star Games. Of the eight games that have featured teams from the East versus West (or IRFU versus WIFU), the West leads the series 5–2–1. The remaining six games featured a CFL All-Star team versus the defending Grey Cup champion. The league team won four of these games, with the Calgary Stampeders and Ottawa Rough Riders each winning once.

References 

All-Star Game
All-star games
1955 establishments in Canada
Recurring sporting events established in 1955